Uranotaenia lowii is a species of mosquito in the family Culicidae.

References

Uranotaenia
Articles created by Qbugbot
Insects described in 1901